Kfar Habou     is a Lebanese village, located in the Miniyeh-Danniyeh District. It had 2,647 eligible voters in the 2009 elections, and the residents belongs to the  "Greek Orthodox Church and other confessions".

History
In 1838, Eli Smith noted  the village as Kefr Habau,  located in the Ed-Dunniyeh area. The inhabitants were Sunni Muslim, Greek Orthodox and Maronite Christians.

References

Bibliography

External links
Kfar Habou, Localiban

Populated places in Miniyeh-Danniyeh District
Populated places in Lebanon
Eastern Orthodox Christian communities in Lebanon